The 2022 Swedish general election was held on 11 September to determine the 349 seats of Sweden's parliament, the Riksdag, for the term lasting until 2026. The opposition right-wing bloc won a majority of seats and later formed the Tidö Agreement. The agreement paved the way to the Kristersson Cabinet, a minority government of Ulf Kristersson's Moderate Party, the Christian Democrats, and Liberals that relies on confidence and supply from the Sweden Democrats (SD), the first time the party is holding direct influence on government policy.

Results 
As of 15 September 2022, the results remained preliminary after a first tally was presented. The official results were announced about a week after the election, showing very minor changes.

Voter demographics 
Sveriges Television exit polling (VALU) suggested the following demographic breakdown based on preliminary results to the nearest integer.

Results by greater region

Percentage share

By votes

Results by statistical area

Percentage share

By votes

Results by constituency

Percentage share

By votes

2018–2022 bloc comparison

Percentage share

By votes

Seat distribution

Results by municipality
Sweden is divided into 21 counties, most of whom are similar to the constituencies underneath and form the 290 municipalities and 6,578 electoral districts. The counties of Sweden are Blekinge, Dalarna, Gotland, Gävleborg, Halland, Jämtland, Jönköping, Kalmar, Kronoberg, Norrbotten, Skåne, Stockholm, Södermanland, Uppsala, Värmland, Västerbotten, Västernorrland, Västmanland, Västra Götaland, Örebro and Östergötland.

In spite of the close overall results, the left bloc won just 78 municipalities to 212 for the right bloc. Instead, the leftist parties carried the large cities by unprecedented margins.

Blekinge

Dalarna

Gotland

Gävleborg

Halland

Jämtland

Jönköping

Kalmar

Kronoberg

Norrbotten

Skåne

Malmö

Skåne NE

Skåne S

Skåne W

Stockholm area

Stockholm

Stockholm County

Södermanland

Uppsala

Värmland

Västerbotten

Västernorrland

Västmanland

Västra Götaland

Gothenburg

Västra Götaland E
The Social Democrats became the largest party in Töreboda Municipality by four votes over the Sweden Democrats, although by a close enough margin for both to be rounded to 29.9% using one decimal.

Västra Götaland N

Västra Götaland S

Västra Götaland W

Örebro

Östergötland

Maps

Non-Riksdag parties
The eleven largest parties that failed to enter the Riksdag but received more than 0.025% of the vote (1 in 4,000) have been included.

Constituencies by percentage share

Constituencies by votes

References 

General elections in Sweden